The BISF house is a British steel framed house, designed and produced by the British Iron and Steel Federation, and erected around the country from 1946.

BISF was an association of steel producers, formed in 1934 in order to provide central planning for the industry. It was prominent in coordinating output through World War II. Post-war, BISF became key in the new Ministry of Works Emergency Factory Made housing programme.

It sponsored a solution for a permanent steel framed housing to a MoW conforming design by architect Sir Frederick Gibberd, who also designed the Howard house.

The BISF is of a conventional design, with simple architectural devices of projecting window surrounds encasing Crittall Hope windows, and differing cladding to the upper and lower stories deal with the junction between components in an understated fashion. The main structure is of steel columns spaced to take standard metal windows between them. The central spine of the building which supports the first floor beams is carried on tubular steel columns. The framework is clad on the lower storey with rendering on metal lath. The outer cladding of the upper floor is of steel trussed sheeting fixed by angles to the steel columns. Traditional materials could be incorporated or simulated, for example a brick cladding to the lower storey, or steel sheet profiled to match timber weatherboarding to the upper. The inner cladding and the partitions are constructed of timber framing faced with plasterboard or hardboard. The upper floors are of tongue & grooved timber and the ceilings are finished with plasterboard or fibreboard. The outer walls and ceilings are insulated with glass quilting.

Produced by the British Steel Homes company, the BISF was a successful design in numerical terms, thanks to the backing of its trade sponsors, who could ensure a supply of steel. The BISF also benefited from a guaranteed order of 30,000 units given directly by the Government in 1941.

BISF houses are often confused with other prefabricated houses built in the same post-war era. This can cause problems because many of the other types of prefabricated housing are listed as Defective Housing and potential buyers can not obtain mortgages. BISF houses however have never been listed as defective and continue to be mortgageable.

As previously stated, BISF Houses were built as permanent homes with a similar expected lifespan to that of a traditional brick built house. They are often wrongly referred to as temporary dwellings and incorrectly classified as such due to their visual similarity to the Aluminium B8 and Arcon temporary bungalows which did have an expected lifespan of just 10 years.

Areas with BISF houses
Areas which have notable concentrations of BISF houses include:

 Bardrainney, a neighbourhood of Port Glasgow, Scotland
 Bellsmyre, a housing estate in Dumbarton, Scotland
 New Lodge, a housing estate in Barnsley, South Yorkshire
 Overslade, a neighbourhood of Rugby, Warwickshire
 Tin Town, a suburb of Luton
 Harrow Weald & Hatch End Harrow, London
 Crowmoor Estate, Shrewsbury,Shropshire

References

External links
 Non-standard house construction - A brief history of the BISF house

House types in the United Kingdom
Public housing in the United Kingdom